Kimberly Ann Pressler (born May 21, 1977) is an American sports reporter, businesswoman, model, and former Miss USA who currently works for FOX on Professional Bowlers Association (PBA) telecasts. Ms. Pressler has been featured in People Magazine, TIME, and voted one of Stuff Magazine.’s “101 Sexiest Women in the World.”
Additionally, Pressler is also Chief Financial Officer (CFO) of Dane Herron Industries, an award-winning, California-based company that specializes in the construction of dirt bike parks, skateparks, track building, event production and stunt coordinating, worldwide.

Early life

Pressler was born in Las Vegas, Nevada to Staff Sergeant Stan Pressler (Air-Force, Retired) and homemaker Michelle Pressler (Kulczyk).  While Ms. Pressler's father was an active airman; she spent her early childhood living the military life in Nevada, California, and Germany before ultimately residing in Western New York where Kimberly completed her schooling, graduating from Ten Broeck Academy of Franklinville.
	
Kimberly continued her education attending Clarion University of Pennsylvania  where she majored in international business before moving on to working full-time for the Department of Energy (DOE) at a nuclear facility in Upstate New York.

Pageant History

Miss New York Teen USA

Pressler captured her first state title in 1994 as Miss New York Teen USA and went on to represent her state the following August in the nationally televised Miss Teen USA pageant.

Miss New York USA

In November 1998, Kimberly was crowned Miss New York USA, one of only four women to seize both the Miss New York Teen USA and Miss New York USA titles in both pageants’ histories.

Miss USA

The following February (1999), Pressler competed at Miss USA 1999, held in Branson, Missouri.  There, she became only the fourth woman from her state to win the Miss USA title, beating press favorites Miss Tennessee USA Morgan Tandy High (the eventual 1st runner-up) and Miss California USA Angelique Breaux.
	
As Miss USA, Kimberly Pressler was an official spokesperson for Breast and Ovarian Cancer Research and helped raise millions for the cause while working closely with the Carol M. Baldwin Research Foundation.

Miss Universe
In May 1999, Pressler represented the US at Miss Universe 1999, held in Trinidad and Tobago., however, she was unplaced. Officially ending the USA's 22-year streak in 1977 to 1998.

Post pageant involvement
Pressler hosted the Miss Massachusetts USA,  and  Miss Massachusetts Teen USA pageants and regularly judges state pageants for the Miss USA & Miss Teen USA systems.  In December 2012, Kimberly was amongst the judges that nominated Erin Brady from East Hampton, Connecticut as Miss Connecticut USA 2013.  In June 2013 Erin went on to win the national title of Miss USA 2013.

Television

Within a month of completing her reign as Miss USA, Ms. Pressler was hired by MTV Network’s "Senseless Acts of Video" where she not only hosted, but performed stunts for three seasons while she was part of the wildly popular show. During her two years with MTV Networks, she also hosted numerous other shows including TRL, "Fast and Famous" and "Becoming".  Kimberly was hired by NBC to host "Adrenaline X", an hour long series about extreme sports. Since that time the series has been syndicated worldwide.

From 2004 to 2006 Kimberly hosted and pit reported for both the "WPSA ATV Championships" on ESPN as well as the "WPSA Snowcross Championships" on the SPEED Channel. In addition, Kimberly was the pit reporter/host for the "Red Bull X Fighters" world tour for three seasons (2006–08). She traveled throughout the world hosting the LIVE freestyle motocross competition that routinely brought in crowds of 40,000 fans.

In 2007, Pressler was heard reporting for the Summer X Games XIII for ESPN and ABC.  In 2008, Kimberly had the honor of being the only female pit reporter to participate in all three X Games competitions held in the United States that year, beginning with the "Winter X Games" in Aspen, Colorado, "NAVY Moto X Championships" in San Diego, California and again for the "Summer X Games" in Los Angeles. Kimberly can even be seen reporting in ESPN’s theatrically released movie X GAMES 3D.  Kimberly reported for X Games until the end of 2008, before departing on maternity leave.

In early 2009, Kimberly was brought on as the host of the "ACIS Fitness National Championships"  for FOX College Sports. She again was asked to host/pit report for the "Red Bull X Fighters" world tour in Texas for ABC Sports. In mid-2009 Kimberly was also the pit reporter for ESPN2 and ABC’s Traxxas TORC Series off-road racing coverage. That same year, Ms. Pressler was heard co-hosting the onsite coverage of the Red Bull New Year No Limits LIVE, when Travis Pastrana jumped from the Long Beach Pier onto a moving barge in front of 75,000 on-lookers.  This was the second time Kimberly had taken part in a Red Bull New Year's Eve event, the previous time in 2007.

In 2010, Ms. Pressler signed on to host Truck Academy on the Outdoor Channel for one season. Upon completion of that series Kimberly became the laneside reporter for the Professional Bowlers Association (PBA) on ESPN, making her debut at the 2010 World Series of Bowling. She has remained in this role through the 2018 PBA season on ESPN. In August, 2018, the PBA announced that Pressler will continue as laneside reporter when the PBA Tour coverage moves to Fox Sports for the 2019 season.

In June 2013, Ms. Pressler was seen covering the Red Bull X Fighters World Tour Series, live from Osaka, Japan on FUEL TV, J Sports 3 in Japan.

References

1977 births
American chief financial officers
Living people
1994 beauty pageant contestants
20th-century Miss Teen USA delegates
Miss Universe 1999 contestants
Miss USA 1999 delegates
Miss USA winners
People from Franklinville, New York
Women chief financial officers
20th-century American people